Leskernick Hill is on Bodmin Moor in Cornwall, UK.  It is 329m high and has grid reference SX183803..  Leskernick Hill is within the Cornwall AONB (Area of Outstanding Natural Beauty) as part of Area 12: Bodmin Moor in the parish of Altarnun.  It lies in an area of moorland that is common land. Its parent hill is Brown Willy and it is within sight of Rough Tor and other local tors

Archaeological sites of Leskernick 
On the south and western slopes of Leskernick Hill are 2 Bronze Age settlements, with associated field enclosures, small cairns, a cist and a propped stone, all of which were designated in October 2019 by Historic England as Scheduled Monument 1464798. It is described in the Cornwall County Council Historic Environment Record as "an extraordinarily well preserved Bronze Age settlement comprising at least 44 round houses set within a very extensive field system covering approximately 21 hectares. The site is located on the extremely stony south-west facing slopes of Leskernick Hill. The surface stones are known as “clitter”, a feature common to the granite outcrops of the South West and associated with geological processes taking place on the fringes of glaciated areas during transitional phases of the Ice Age. As the surrounding areas are relatively stone-free, the siting of the settlement in this area is assumed to be deliberate."

Associated with the Leskernick settlement site are 2 stone circles and a stone row/alignment in the valley below:

 Leskernick South Stone Circle - Scheduled Monument 1459490.  "The circle consists of 23 granite stones set in a circle of approximately 30m diameter"

 Leskernick North Stone Circle - Scheduled Monument 1460916.  "The stone circle comprises a recumbent stone (4m long) a little north of the circle’s centre with 25 stones in an almost-perfect circle approximately 23m in diameter£
 Leskernick Stone Alignment - Scheduled Monument 1461019.  "The alignment is 317m long and comprises 47 small, low, square-topped stones, all except two lying, and mostly less than 0.5m high. There are three large recumbent stones at the western terminal. The stones are fairly evenly-spaced, 4m to 5m apart"

The stones of the circles and row were re-exposed in 2016, as they had become overgrown with turf.  The work was undertaken by the Time Seekers Clearance Group volunteers, under the supervision of Historic England's area Heritage At Risk Officer.  As part of their work, the volunteers recommended the three sites were designated as Scheduled Monuments, which was completed in October 2019.  As described by the volunteers:"From  the  very  moment  we  arrived  at  Leskernick  we  felt  we  were  in  a  special  place  –  a  place of  wonder  and  great  importance.  It  is  enclosed  by  a  series  of  hills,  ridges  and  tors  in  all directions  and  just  shouts  out  that  importance.  The  landscape  is  breathtaking.  To  stand  on the  top  of  Leskernick  Hill  you  can’t  help  but  feel  that  you  are  in  the  centre  of  a  world  that  was once  a  Kingdom  -  an  enclosed  world  -  with  only  a  hint  or  speculation  of  a  possible  world beyond.  The  Beacon,  Tolborough  Tor,  Catshole  Tor,  Brown  Willy,  Rough  Tor,  Showery  Tor, High  Moor,  Buttern  Hill,  Bray  Down,  and  Carne  Down  all  lock  you  in  -  and  beyond  in  the distance,  Brown  Gelly."

Archaeological Research at Leskernick 
Between 1995-1999, Barbara Bender, Sue Hamilton and Christopher Tilley directed a changing group of UCL students in the landscape investigation of the late Neolithic and Bronze Age archaeological sites on, and near, Leskernick Hill, with associated archaeological excavations.  Named the Leskernick Project, this took an experimental approach to develop new techniques for post processual interpretative archaeology, with a focus on the phenomenology - the lived sensory experience - of the archaeological landscape

Selected publications 

 Barnatt, J,1982. Prehistoric Cornwall: The Ceremonial Monuments. Turnstone Press Limited. 
 Johnson, R. and Rose, P, 1994. Bodmin Moor: An Archaeological Survey. Vol.1: The human landscape to c1800. English Heritage. .
 Bender, B, Hamilton, S., and Tilley, C. 1997. Leskernick: Stone worlds, alternative narratives, nested landscapes. Proceedings of the Prehistoric Society 63: 147-178.  https://www.researchgate.net/publication/273030093
 Herring, P, 1997. Early Prehistoric Sites at Leskernick, Altarnun  in Cornish Archaeology 36 pp176-185
 Hamilton, S., Tilley, C. and Bender, B. 1999. Bronze Age stone worlds of Bodmin Moor: excavating Leskernick. Archaeology International 3: 13–17.
 Hamilton, S., Harrison, S., and Bender, B. 2008. "Conflicting Imaginations: Archaeology, Anthropology and Geomorphology on Leskernick Hill, Bodmin Moor, Southwest Britain." Geoforum 39 (2): 602-15.
 Bender, B., Hamilton, S., and Tilley, C. 2016. Stone Worlds: Narrative and Reflexivity in Landscape Archaeology. London: Routledge
 Seager Thomas, M. 2011. Excavating on the Moor. Artefact Services Research Papers 1. https://archive.org/details/asrp1excavatingonthemoor

See Also 

 Barbara Bender
 Sue Hamilton
 Christopher Tilley
 Bodmin Moor
 Cornish Bronze Age
 Cornwall Area of Outstanding Natural Beauty
 Hills of Cornwall

External Links 

 Leskernick - Cornwall County Council Historic Environment Record 
 Cornwall AONB - Area 12: Bodmin Moor 
 The UCL Leskernick Project (landscape archaeology research)
 Leskernick Hill - Hill Bagging - the online version of the Database of British and Irish Hills

References 

Bodmin Moor
Bronze Age sites in Cornwall